Call Me D-Nice is the debut studio album by American rapper D-Nice. It was released in 1990 via Jive Records and produced entirely by D-Nice. The album peaked at number 75 on the Billboard 200 and number 12 on the Top R&B/Hip-Hop Albums. Its self-titled lead single peaked at number 1 on the Hot Rap Songs and number 19 on the Hot R&B/Hip-Hop Songs, and the second single "Crumbs on the Table" also peaked at number 17 on the Hot Rap Songs.

Track listing

Sample credits

 Track 1 contains samples from: "Crumbs off the Table" by Laura Lee, "Operator's Choice", "Comic Shop", and "Saturday Night Style" by Mikey Dread 
 Track 2 contains samples from: "Buzzsaw" by The Turtles and "(This Is) Detroit Soul" by Paul Nero 
 Track 3 contains samples from: "Take the Money and Run" by Steve Miller Band 
 Track 4 contains samples from: "Mama Told Me (Not to Come)" by Three Dog Night 
 Track 5 contains samples from: "I Meant to Do That" from Pee-wee's Big Adventure 
 Track 6 contains samples from: "Action (LP Version)" by Orange Krush, "This Is Something for the Radio" by Biz Markie 
 Track 7 contains samples from: "Square Business" by Blue Mitchell 
 Track 8 contains samples from: "Mind Power" by James Brown 
 Track 9 contains samples from: "A Gritty Nitty" by The Pazant Brothers and The Beaufort Express, "Super Hoe" by Boogie Down Productions 
 Track 10 contains samples from: "Tales of Taboo" by Karen Finley

Personnel
 Derrick Jones - vocals, producer, mixing
 Dawnn Lewis - vocals (track 6)
 Carl Bourelly - co-producer (tracks: 3, 6)
 Sidney Miller - co-producer (track 5)
 Barbera Aimes - engineer
 Dwayne Sumal - engineer
 Anthony Saunders - assistant engineer
 Eric Gast - assistant engineer
 Peter Christensen - assistant engineer
 Tim Latham - assistant engineer
 Barbara Catanzaro-Hearn - photography
 John Mahdessian - photography

Charts

Album

Singles

References

External links 

D-Nice albums
1990 debut albums
Jive Records albums